Meridith Baer (born August 21, 1947) is an American entrepreneur, businesswoman and designer, best known for establishing the design and real estate practice of "home staging" and founding her own home staging firm in the United States, Meridith Baer Home. In 2013, HGTV premiered a television show about Baer and her firm titled Staged To Perfection.

Early life
Meridith Baer attended the University of Colorado in Boulder where she received a BS in Journalism.

Acting & Screenwriting
Prior to her graduation, Baer was approached on the University of Colorado campus by producer Jerry Bruckheimer who cast Baer in a Pepsi commercial. This ultimately launched Baer's prolific career in acting, in which she appeared in more than 100 television commercials, as well as modeling for Winston, as a Kent girl and a Benson & Hedges girl. At the same time, Baer continued to put her journalism degree to work writing articles like “The Passionate Shopper”  for New York Magazine and for other publications including Penthouse and Viva.

In 1975, Baer moved to Los Angeles, where she continued to act in film and television, including appearances on popular programs including "CHIPS", "Eight is Enough", and Happy Days. In 1981 she sold her first screenplay, Prisoners, for $250,000. A fictional love story about a teenage girl growing up on a prison reservation in the 1950s, the film was produced by 20th Century Fox and starred actress Tatum O’Neal. Baer's follow-up script, "Unbecoming Age", also released as The Magic Bubbles'', was a comedy about a woman who has a mid-life crisis triggered by her turning 40 and features a young George Clooney in a supporting role.

Meridith Baer Home
Meridith launched her business, Meridith Baer Home, in 1998 and today has over 250 employees and 35 designers under her helm. The firm  provides home staging, interior design and luxury home furniture leasing services from the company's offices in Los Angeles, New York, San Francisco, Connecticut and Florida. Meridith Baer Home holds 300,000 square feet of inventory in its warehouse facilities on the west and east coasts.

Recognized as the world's number one home staging firm, Meridith Baer Home has provided its services to thousands of celebrities and billionaires including Cindy Crawford and Rande Gerber, Jimmy Kimmel, Julia Roberts, Madonna, Halle Berry Brad Pitt, Sharon Stone, Bob Dylan and Harrison Ford. Projects have ranged from $700,000 bungalows to $125 million estates.

HGTV “Staged To Perfection”
After an appearance on the HGTV series "Selling L.A." Baer was approached by several networks about developing a television series about her home staging work. In 2013, she launched her own television show on HGTV, entitled “Staged To Perfection”. The show chronicled Baer and her team of 18 designers as she staged luxury properties that have stalled on the market for over a month.

Filmography

Television

References

External links
 
 
 
 

1947 births
Living people
Artists from Los Angeles
American film actresses
American interior designers
American television actresses
University of Colorado Boulder alumni
Writers from Los Angeles
Writers from Des Moines, Iowa
Actresses from Los Angeles
Screenwriters from California
Actresses from Des Moines, Iowa
Screenwriters from Iowa
20th-century American actresses